Pizzo Scalino is a mountain of the Bernina Range in  Lombardy, Italy. It is known as the Valemalenco Matterhorn due to its pyramidal shape when viewed from the valley below. It
lies close to Piz Cancian, where the border with Switzerland runs. The mountain is usually climbed from the Campo Moro Dam. From the summit, the whole of the Bernina Range is visible. It was first climbed in 1830.

References

External links
Pizzo Scalino on Hikr

Mountains of the Alps
Alpine three-thousanders
Bernina Range
Mountains of Lombardy